The 2006 IRL IndyCar Series began on March 26 and concluded on September 10. Sam Hornish Jr. won his third IndyCar Series championship. The title chase was very dramatic between Penske drivers Hornish and Hélio Castroneves battling Ganassi drivers Dan Wheldon and Scott Dixon. The four drivers occupied the first four positions in the final race at Chicagoland Speedway, with Wheldon leading Dixon home for a Ganassi 1–2, but Hornish finishing third, edging out reigning champion Wheldon on a tiebreak. Third would have been enough to catapult fourth-place finisher Castroneves to take the title, but he instead ended up two points behind Hornish and Wheldon. Dixon was also in strong title contention, finishing a mere 15 points adrift of the championship.

The season was marred by the death of Paul Dana during practice at Homestead.

2006 also the final season for Panoz chassis as an official chassis manufacturer in the series.

Commentators
The official commentators were Marty Reid, Scott Goodyear, and Rusty Wallace, with pit reports from Jack Arute, Jerry Punch, Vince Welch, and Jamie Little, and pre race hosting from Brent Musburger.

Off season changes
2006 for the Indy Racing League was much different from 2005. The biggest change being the withdrawal of Chevrolet- and Toyota-powered cars from the series, leaving Honda as the only engine manufacturer. There was much speculation after this announcement that because there would not be nearly as much money provided to teams by engine providers as in previous years, many of them would scale back. To some extent, this was true: Ganassi Racing pared its team from three to two cars and Panther Racing and Cheever Racing from two to one. However, Tony George and Patrick Dempsey's Vision Racing added a car for displaced Tomas Scheckter. Honda also reduced the costs of both year-long and Indy-only engine leases, promised that all teams would be provided with identical engines and technical support, and that engines would last two races between scheduled rebuilds—all significant cost-cutting measures compared to previous years.

The chassis situation is little changed from 2005, the largest change being Ganassi Racing's switch from Panoz to Dallara for oval races. The full-season runners using the Panoz in 2006 were Rahal Letterman Racing's three cars and Delphi Fernandez Racing's Scott Sharp.

2006 also saw the elimination of three rounds of the championship from the 2005 season. The Phoenix International Raceway race was cancelled because of scheduling conflicts. The California Speedway round was not retained because the IRL wanted to move its date earlier in the season so as to not conflict with the NFL season, but a date that was available for both the speedway and the league could not be found. Both the IRL and California Speedway hope that a race there will return for 2007. The Pikes Peak International Raceway was eliminated from the 2006 schedule as the track was sold by its owners and subsequently closed. Further explanation for this new schedule was given by the league as being more "compact" and "exciting" and as a method of avoiding lost television ratings and race attendance by finishing their race season before the NFL season. Many critics viewed this shortened schedule as a definite setback for the series, not an improvement.

There were also a handful of significant driver moves, most important of which was 2005 series champion Dan Wheldon moving to Ganassi Racing from Andretti Green Racing, where he was replaced by Marco Andretti. Additionally, Tomas Scheckter moved from Panther Racing to a new car at Vision Racing and Vítor Meira moved from Rahal Letterman to Scheckter's seat at Panther. Paul Dana and his personal sponsor filled Meira's spot at Rahal Letterman. Eddie Cheever announced that he would return to the role of owner-driver of his single car team for the first four races, including the Indianapolis 500, and Michael Andretti announced he would return to the cockpit to drive alongside his son in the "500". A. J. Foyt IV, who left for NASCAR, was replaced by Felipe Giaffone in Foyt Enterprises' car, while Buddy Lazier returned to a full-time ride in the series by replacing the struggling Roger Yasukawa at Dreyer & Reinbold Racing. Hemelgarn Racing signed P. J. Chesson late in the offseason with backing from Carmelo Anthony to replace the outgoing Paul Dana.

There were also ongoing rumors during the offseason that Tony George and Champ Car principal Kevin Kalkhoven had been meeting and discussing a potential merger, or a new series that would re-unite open wheel racing in America. The two men have admitted to meeting and enjoying each other's company in skiing and golf, and in separate March 2006 interviews with the Los Angeles Times admitted that they were in fact discussing the prospects of combining the two series .

Mid-season changes

 Following Paul Dana's death in a crash before the first race, Rahal-Letterman hired Jeff Simmons to drive the #17 car two races later at Motegi.
 Roberto Moreno replaced an injured Ed Carpenter for round 2 only. Carpenter returned for all the remaining races.
 Following an Indy 500 where both Hemelgarn cars crashed into each other and finished in the last two positions, Hemelgarn Racing, which had been running full-time with P. J. Chesson, ceased operations.
 After the Kansas Speedway race, Cheever Racing ceased operations due to lack of sponsorship. Also, Foyt Enterprises replaced Felipe Giaffone with Jeff Bucknum.
 Dreyer & Reinbold Racing announced that Ryan Briscoe, who drove their car to a third place at Watkins Glen, would drive their car in the remaining short oval and road course races instead of Buddy Lazier and that Sarah Fisher would race the car at the remaining  tracks, Kentucky and Chicagoland.
 Marty Roth returned to the series after crashing in Indy 500 practice and missing the race to drive his own Roth Racing machine in the final 3 oval races of the season (Michigan, Kentucky, and Chicagoland).

Confirmed entries

All IndyCar Series entries utilized Honda Indy V8 HI6R engines

Race summaries

Toyota Indy 300

This race held at Homestead-Miami Speedway was run on March 26 and covered by ABC. Sam Hornish Jr. won the pole.

The race was marred by a violent crash in the final practice session. Paul Dana was killed in the crash and teammates Danica Patrick and Buddy Rice withdrew from the race to honor his memory. He was the third driver to lose his life in the IRL. Ed Carpenter was also injured and would miss this race plus the next race.

Top ten results

10- Dan Wheldon 200 laps
3- Hélio Castroneves +0.0147 (9th closest finish in IRL history)
6- Sam Hornish Jr. +0.4744
27- Dario Franchitti +0.9401
9- Scott Dixon +1.1989
55- Kosuke Matsuura +2 laps
8- Scott Sharp +2 laps
14- Felipe Giaffone +2 laps
2- Tomas Scheckter +3 laps
51- Eddie Cheever +4 laps

 IRL Video Synopsis of the Race

Annotated Video of Race Summary

Honda Grand Prix of St. Petersburg

The Streets of St. Petersburg race was held on April 2 and covered by ESPN. Dario Franchitti won the pole, but was knocked out early due to mechanical failure. The race finished under the yellow flag after Tomas Scheckter and Buddy Rice hit the barrier with 4 laps to go. Roberto Moreno replaced Ed Carpenter for this race as Ed recovered from his injury's but finished 18th due to steering issues.

Top ten results

3- Hélio Castroneves 100 laps
9- Scott Dixon +0.1386
11- Tony Kanaan +0.6284
7- Bryan Herta +0.7813
4- Vítor Meira +2.5995
16- Danica Patrick +3.0433
55- Kosuke Matsuura +52.7172
6- Sam Hornish Jr. +1 lap
14- Felipe Giaffone +1 lap
8- Scott Sharp +1 lap

Indy Japan 300
The Twin Ring Motegi, Japan race was run on April 22 and covered (via tape delay) by ESPN. Qualifying was rained out and the field was set by entrant points. As a result, Hélio Castroneves sat on pole, and for the second race running, Castroneves won the race. This race also saw the return of Ed Carpenter after the accident at Homestead.  Rahal Letterman Racing also returned the #17 car to competition after sitting out a second race, as Indy Pro Series driver Jeff Simmons moved up to the seat.  While Simmons has two IndyCar Series races to his experience (one the 2004 Indianapolis 500), he is eligible for the Bombardier series Rookie of the Year contest for 2006. However, on lap 42, Simmons was involved in a crash with Scott Sharp and P. J. Chesson which resulted in Simmons sliding along the track upside down. Simmons was uninjured.

Top ten results

3- Hélio Castroneves 200 laps
10- Dan Wheldon +6.3851
11- Tony Kanaan +8.6163
6- Sam Hornish Jr. +9.0011
15- Buddy Rice +9.7491
7- Bryan Herta +13.8972
55- Kosuke Matsuura +14.7633
16- Danica Patrick +15.4456
9- Scott Dixon +1 lap
4- Vítor Meira +1 lap

90th Indianapolis 500

The Indy 500 was run on May 28 and covered by ABC. Sam Hornish Jr. won the pole with a 4-lap average of 228.985 mph (2:37.2155). It was Hornish's 10th pole of his short, but yet outstanding career. Hornish then went on to win the race, beating Marco Andretti in the second-closest finish in Indy 500 history. Dan Wheldon led most laps with 148.

Top ten results

6- Sam Hornish Jr. 200 laps
26- Marco Andretti +0.0635
1- Michael Andretti +1.0087
10- Dan Wheldon +1.2692
11- Tony Kanaan +1.6456
9- Scott Dixon +3.0566
27- Dario Franchitti +5.6249
16- Danica Patrick +5.7263
8- Scott Sharp +11.1252
4- Vítor Meira +17.9554

Watkins Glen Indy Grand Prix presented by Tissot
The Watkins Glen International race was run on June 4 and covered by ABC. Qualifying was cancelled due to fog and the field was set based on Friday practice speeds. Hélio Castroneves sat on pole.  The race was shortened to 55 laps from the scheduled 60 due to the 2 hour time limit. The race also made history as the first ever IRL race to be run in wet conditions. Scott Dixon won from Panther Racing's Vítor Meira and Australia's Ryan Briscoe, of Dreyer & Reinbold Racing.

As of 2020 it was the last-ever IndyCar Series victory for Panoz chassis to date.
Top ten results

9- Scott Dixon 55 laps
4- Vítor Meira +2.3311
5- Ryan Briscoe +2.7999
15- Buddy Rice +9.2284
14- Felipe Giaffone +11.4811
20- Ed Carpenter +12.4427
3- Hélio Castroneves +13.0455
16- Danica Patrick +13.3289
8- Scott Sharp +16.6462
2- Tomas Scheckter +48.4872

Video Synopsis of Race

Annotated Version of IRL Race Summary

Bombardier Learjet 500
The Texas race was run on June 10 and covered by ESPN. Sam Hornish Jr. won the pole. Hélio Castroneves captured his second Texas win and third win of the season.  Dan Wheldon had led most of the race and looked in control only for a short delay on his final pit stop to drop him back to third.

Top ten results

3- Hélio Castroneves 200 laps
9- Scott Dixon +0.2402
10- Dan Wheldon +0.2981
6- Sam Hornish Jr. +14.5389
8- Scott Sharp +14.5895
4- Vítor Meira +15.9294
11- Tony Kanaan +16.1398
55- Kosuke Matsuura +22.3327
20- Ed Carpenter +22.9791
2- Tomas Scheckter +1 lap

IRL Race Summary 

  Annotated Race Summary Video

SunTrust Indy Challenge
The Richmond International Raceway race was run on June 24 and covered by ESPN. Qualifying was rained out and Hélio Castroneves won the pole based on combined practice speeds. Sam Hornish Jr. has won the race, leading 212 of 250 laps. The race finished in yellow flag at 4 laps to go due a blown tire from Hélio Castroneves which dropped him to 10th place.

Top Ten Results

6- Sam Hornish Jr. 250 laps
4- Vítor Meira +0.3907
27- Dario Franchitti +1.5895
26- Marco Andretti +6.5400
8- Scott Sharp +6.6677
7- Bryan Herta +10.9217
2- Tomas Scheckter +1 lap
20- Ed Carpenter +1 lap
10- Dan Wheldon +1 lap
3- Hélio Castroneves +1 lap

Kansas Lottery Indy 300
The Kansas Speedway race was run on July 2 and covered by ABC. Dan Wheldon won the pole. Sam Hornish Jr. won the race taking the lead from Wheldon with two laps to go.  This was the 50th IRL race where 1st and 2nd were separated by less than a second.

Top ten results
6- Sam Hornish Jr. 200 laps
10- Dan Wheldon +0.0793
4- Vítor Meira +5.3892
9- Scott Dixon +5.5158
11- Tony Kanaan +5.7762
3- Hélio Castroneves +7.0432
2- Tomas Scheckter +9.6925
55- Kosuke Matsuura +9.9881
26- Marco Andretti +1 lap
17- Jeff Simmons +1 lap

Firestone Indy 200
The Nashville Superspeedway race was run on July 15 and covered by ESPN. Dan Wheldon won the pole. Scott Dixon won his second race of the season and captured his first win on an oval since 2003.

Top ten results:
9- Scott Dixon 200 laps
10- Dan Wheldon +0.1176
4- Vítor Meira +1.2756
16- Danica Patrick +2.5019
3- Hélio Castroneves +3.5647
27- Dario Franchitti +11.9449
17- Jeff Simmons +1 lap
26- Marco Andretti +1 lap
5- Ryan Briscoe +1 lap
20- Ed Carpenter +2 laps

ABC Supply Company A. J. Foyt 225
The Milwaukee Mile race was run on July 23 and covered by ESPN. Hélio Castroneves won the pole. Tony Kanaan led most of the race and gave Andretti Green Racing its first win of the season.

Top ten results
11- Tony Kanaan 225 laps
6- Sam Hornish Jr. +1.8276
2- Tomas Scheckter +2.0114
16- Danica Patrick +8.4708
26- Marco Andretti +10.2611
27- Dario Franchitti +11.2373
7- Bryan Herta +14.1195
10- Dan Wheldon +1 lap
17- Jeff Simmons +2 laps
9- Scott Dixon +2 laps

Firestone Indy 400
The Michigan International Speedway race was run on July 30 and covered by ABC. The race start was delayed almost 3 hours and the race was aired tape delayed on ESPN2. Hélio Castroneves got his fourth race win of the season from the pole.

Top ten results:
3- Hélio Castroneves 200 laps
4- Vítor Meira +1.6229
10- Dan Wheldon +6.2259
11- Tony Kanaan +6.9874
2- Tomas Scheckter +27.9005
8- Scott Sharp +28.5560
20- Ed Carpenter +1 lap
26- Marco Andretti +1 lap
55- Kosuke Matsuura +1 lap
17- Jeff Simmons +1 lap

Meijer Indy 300 presented by Coca-Cola and Secret
The Kentucky Speedway race was run on August 13 and covered by ABC. Hélio Castroneves won the pole. Sam Hornish Jr. captured his 4th win of the year and re-took the points lead. This was also the second IRL race with two female drivers in the field, the first was the 2000 Indianapolis 500.

Top ten results:
6- Sam Hornish Jr. 200 laps
9- Scott Dixon +0.5866
3- Hélio Castroneves +0.6511
10- Dan Wheldon +1.8913
11- Tony Kanaan +2.3049
4- Vítor Meira +2.5191
2- Tomas Scheckter +2.8124
16- Danica Patrick +3.2408
27- Dario Franchitti +4.7070
7- Bryan Herta +4.7966

Indy Grand Prix of Sonoma
The Infineon Raceway race was run on August 27 and covered by ESPN. Scott Dixon won the pole. Marco Andretti became the youngest winner of a major open wheel race and the first new IRL winner since Adrian Fernandez in 2004.

Top ten results:
26- Marco Andretti 80 laps
27- Dario Franchitti +0.6557
4- Vítor Meira +10.6535
9- Scott Dixon +11.1867
3- Hélio Castroneves +12.5049
10- Dan Wheldon +13.4493
17- Jeff Simmons +13.8754
16- Danica Patrick +15.7417
6- Sam Hornish Jr. +16.3369
7- Bryan Herta +18.5571

Peak Antifreeze Indy 300 presented by Mr. Clean
The Chicagoland Speedway race was run on September 10 and covered by ABC. Sam Hornish Jr. won the pole and clinched the championship by finishing third. Dan Wheldon won the race and tied Hornish in season points, but lost the title due to the tiebreaker (most wins).

Top ten results:
10- Dan Wheldon 200 laps
9- Scott Dixon +0.1897
6- Sam Hornish Jr. +0.2323
3- Hélio Castroneves +2.6913
20- Ed Carpenter +1 lap
4- Vítor Meira +1 lap
11- Tony Kanaan +1 lap
17- Jeff Simmons +1 lap
8- Scott Sharp +1 lap
2- Tomas Scheckter +1 lap

Season summary

Schedule

 Oval/Speedway
 Road course
 Temporary street circuit
BOLD indicates Superspeedways.

Race results

Final driver standings

 Ties in points broken by number of wins, followed by number of 2nds, 3rds, etc., and then by number of pole positions, followed by number of times qualified 2nd, etc.
  Paul Dana collided with Ed Carpenter's disabled car in the practice session at Homestead-Miami Speedway. Dana was transported to a hospital, where he died due to complications from his injuries sustained in the crash. He was 30 years old.

See also
 2006 Indianapolis 500
 2006 Indy Pro Series season
 2006 Champ Car season
 2006 Champ Car Atlantic season

Footnotes

External links
IndyCar.com – official site
Indianapolis 500 – official site

IndyCar Series seasons
Indycar Series Season, 2006
 
IndyCar Series